Jackson Merrett (born 27 February 1993) is a former professional Australian rules footballer who played for the Essendon Football Club in the Australian Football League (AFL). He was recruited by the Essendon Football Club with the 31st overall selection in the 2011 national draft. He made his AFL debut against Collingwood at the Melbourne Cricket Ground in round 23 of the 2012 AFL season. He is the older brother and former teammate of Zach Merrett.

Merrett was delisted at the end of the 2018 season. He played for Peel Thunder in the WAFL until 2021 and currently plays for Ballarat .

References

External links

1993 births
Living people
Essendon Football Club players
Australian rules footballers from Victoria (Australia)
Geelong Falcons players
Bendigo Football Club players
Peel Thunder Football Club players